The Bigs (stylized as The BIGS) is an arcade-style baseball video game for the Xbox 360, PlayStation 3, PlayStation 2, Wii and PlayStation Portable. It was released in June 2007 in North America, and in October in the PAL region (Wii only). A sequel, The Bigs 2, was released on July 7, 2009.

Gameplay 
It features "outrageous visuals and intuitive gameplay mechanics", focusing on stylistic rather than realistic design, and gameplay featuring power-ups and turbo. It has also given the game of baseball a more "street" feel to it. The game features online play capability for up to four players on most of the seventh generation consoles, though online play is not compatible on the Wii. The St. Louis Cardinals' first baseman, Albert Pujols, is on the cover. Minnesota Twins first baseman and former MVP Justin Morneau is featured on the cover of limited edition Canadian version sold exclusively by Future Shop and Best Buy. Radio host Damon Bruce provides play-by-play commentary.

When the first trailer was released, gameplay bore a striking resemblance to Midway Games' MLB Slugfest series. However, in an IGN interview, producer Dan Brady stated that "the Slugfest design team made a lot of choices that really made it difficult for a fan of baseball to take the game seriously. Punching on the base path was just one of many of those decisions. The Bigs is authentic baseball taken to arcade proportions".

Game modes 
 Rookie Challenge: The user designs a custom player, assigns him to an MLB team and guides him through spring training and the MLB season. Attribute points to improve the player are rewarded for offensive prowess and the completion of various mini-games that test the player's skill in a variety of areas. The player can also steal 10 players from opposing teams after defeating them in certain games.
 Home Run Pinball: This mode puts the player in the middle of Times Square, New York City with the objective of hitting baseballs into neon signs and windows in order score the highest points possible. The player can then upload their score to the online leader boards and see where they rank.
 Home Run Derby: A first-to-10 showdown between two hitters.

Multiplayer 
Offline multiplayer supports up to four players, with Xbox Live support for two.

Reception 

The PlayStation 3 and Xbox 360 versions received "generally favorable reviews", while the PlayStation 2, PSP, and Wii versions received "average" reviews, according to the review aggregation website Metacritic.

References

External links 
Official site

2007 video games
2K Games franchises
2K Sports games
Major League Baseball video games
PlayStation 2 games
PlayStation 3 games
PlayStation Portable games
Take-Two Interactive franchises
Video games developed in Canada
Wii games
Xbox 360 games
Take-Two Interactive games
Multiplayer and single-player video games
Capcom Vancouver games